Ruitz is a commune in the Pas-de-Calais department in the Hauts-de-France region of France.

The trumpeter Alexis Demailly was born in Ruitz in 1980.

Geography

Population

Places of interest
 The church of St. Maurice, dating from the thirteenth century.
 The eighteenth-century chateau.

See also
Communes of the Pas-de-Calais department

References

Communes of Pas-de-Calais